The Military class of Admiralty trawlers was a small class of trawlers built for the Royal Navy during the Second World War.

The purpose of the order was to make use of specialist mercantile shipyards to provide vessels for war use by adapting commercial designs to Admiralty specifications. Between 1941 and 1943 the Royal Navy ordered nine such vessels from Cook Welton and Gemmel. All saw active service, but none were lost in action. The Military-class trawlers were the largest trawlers built for the Royal Navy and bear comparison with the s.

Ships 
 Bombardier (T304), completed 19 May 1943
 Coldstreamer (T337), completed 10 April 1943
 Fusilier (T305), completed 30 April 1943
  (T334), completed 10 February 1943
 Guardsman (T393), completed 22 August 1944
 Home Guard (T394), completed 10 September 1944
 Lancer (T335), completed 25 February 1943
 Royal Marine (T395), completed 30 October 1944
 Sapper (T336), completed 19 March 1943

See also 
 Trawlers of the Royal Navy

Notes

References
 Conway : Conway's All the World's Fighting Ships 1922–1946 (1980) 
Elliott, Peter: Allied Escort Ships of World War II (1977)

External links
 Military class trawlers at uboat.net

Naval trawlers of the United Kingdom